Ort im Innkreis is a municipality in the district of Ried im Innkreis in the Austrian state of Upper Austria.

Geography
Ort lies in the Innviertel. About 15 percent of the municipality is forest, and 74 percent is farmland.

References

Cities and towns in Ried im Innkreis District